Will Reilly (born December 3, 2002) is an American soccer player who plays for the Stanford Cardinal.

Club career 
On July 13, 2019, Reilly appeared for Atlanta United 2, the USL Championship affiliate of Atlanta United FC, appearing as a half-time substitute in an 8–1 loss to New York Red Bulls II.

Reilly enrolled at Stanford University and joined their men's soccer team in 2021. He made his collegiate debut on August 26 against the SMU Mustangs.

References

External links

 Stanford bio

2002 births
Living people
American soccer players
Association football midfielders
Atlanta United 2 players
Soccer players from Georgia (U.S. state)
USL Championship players
People from Decatur, Georgia
Sportspeople from DeKalb County, Georgia
Stanford Cardinal men's soccer players